Charles Lovett Keyser (January 19, 1930 – July 31, 2022) was the fourth bishop suffragan for the Armed Forces in the Episcopal Church. He was consecrated on March 24, 1990, and retired on February 29, 2000, when he served as an assisting bishop in the Episcopal Diocese of Florida.

Keyser earned a B.A. degree from The University of the South in 1951. In 1954, he received his M.Div. degree from St. Luke's Seminary in Sewanee, Tennessee. On February 15, 1955, Keyser was ordained an Episcopal priest by Bishop Frank Juhan in Jacksonville, Florida. On February 20, 1956, he was commissioned as a reserve officer in the U.S. Navy Chaplain Corps. Keyser served on USS Pocono from December 1964 to June 1967. He was promoted to commander on April 1, 1967. Keyser later served with the 1st Marine Division in Vietnam from June 1969 to July 1970. He was promoted to captain on July 1, 1973.

See also
 List of Episcopal bishops of the United States
 Historical list of the Episcopal bishops of the United States

References 

 Episcopal Clerical Directory, 2015

External links 
Diocese of Florida website

1933 births
2022 deaths
People from Greenville, South Carolina
Sewanee: The University of the South alumni
United States Navy officers
United States Navy chaplains
United States Navy personnel of the Vietnam War
Episcopal bishops of Florida
Episcopal bishops for the Armed Forces (United States)